Bunda Station is a pastoral lease that operates as a cattle station in the Northern Territory of Australia.

The property was originally part of Inverway Station until it was carved up into Inverway, Bunda and Riveren Stations. Bunda is bounded to the west by Kirkimbie, the south by Wallamunga, the east by Inverway and the north by Limbunya Station.

To water stock 22 bores have been sunk.

The Underwood family have owned the property since 1956 when it was still part of Inverway Station.

Consolidated Pastoral Company acquired the station, adjacent to Kirkimbie which it already owns, in the Victoria River District in the Northern Territory for approximately 15 million in 2014. The property had been passed in at auction two years earlier for 10 million.

See also
List of ranches and stations

References

Pastoral leases in the Northern Territory
Stations (Australian agriculture)